Kenneth Geddes (born September 27, 1947) is a former American football linebacker who played mainly for the Los Angeles Rams, in an eight-year career that lasted from 1971 to 1978 in the National Football League (NFL).

Boys Town, Nebraska

Geddes came to Boys Town from Jacksonville, FL after the passing of his mother. Leaving behind all he knew, including 17 siblings, he found his place at Boys Town. Geddes excelled as an athlete. He earned All-American and All-State honors. 

Geddes played college football at University of Nebraska and was drafted in the seventh round of the 1970 NFL Draft by the Detroit Lions.

References 

1947 births
Living people
American football linebackers
Los Angeles Rams players
Seattle Seahawks players
Nebraska Cornhuskers football players